Pablo Cuevas and Horacio Zeballos won the title, defeating Daniele Bracciali and Potito Starace in the final, 6–4, 6–1.

Seeds

  Pablo Cuevas /  Horacio Zeballos (champions)
  Daniele Bracciali /  Potito Starace (final)
  Dominik Meffert /  Tim Puetz (semifinals)
  Nicolás Barrientos /  Juan Carlos Spir (semifinals)

Draw

Draw

External links
 Main Draw

XII Venice Challenge Save Cupandnbsp;- Doubles
2014 Doubles